St. John the Baptist School may refer to:

India
 St. John the Baptist High School, Thane

United Kingdom
 St. John the Baptist School (Aberdare), Wales
 St. John the Baptist School (Woking), Surrey

United States
 St. John the Baptist Parish School Board, Louisiana
 St. John the Baptist School (Minnesota)
 St. John the Baptist High School (St. Louis, Missouri)
 St. John The Baptist School (Alden, New York)
 St. John The Baptist School (Peabody, Massachusetts)
 St. John the Baptist Diocesan High School, West Islip, New York